Carlo Caporali (born 27 April 1994) is an Italian professional footballer who plays as a centre back for Serie D club Sant'Angelo.

Club career
Born in Vicenza, Caporali made his senior debut for Serie D club Montecchio Maggiore on 2011–12 season.

On 3 September 2015, he signed for A.C. Este.

In July 2017, he joined Serie D club Campodarsego.

On 9 July 2019, he signed for Trento.

On 15 September 2022, Caporali moved to Sant'Angelo in Serie D.

References

External links
 
 

1994 births
Living people
Sportspeople from Vicenza
Footballers from Veneto
Italian footballers
Association football defenders
Serie C players
Serie D players
Eccellenza players
Calcio Padova players
Real Vicenza V.S. players
A.C. Este players
A.C.D. Campodarsego players
A.C. Trento 1921 players
A.C.D. Sant'Angelo 1907 players